2000 WNBA draft

On December 15, 1999, a WNBA expansion draft took place.
On April 25, 2000 the regular WNBA draft took place.

Key

Expansion draft

College draft

Round 1

Round 2

Round 3

Round 4

References

Women's National Basketball Association Draft
Draft